Megachile reicherti is a species of bee in the family Megachilidae. It was described by Johannes Brahms in 1929.

References

Reicherti
Insects described in 1929